Mahmoud Bahaa is a town in north Algeria.

Communes of Guelma Province